The All Africa Challenge Trophy (abbreviated as AACT)  is a biennial continental ladies golf championship in Africa that had its inaugural edition in May 1992.

History 
The idea of the tournament was mooted by Tessa Covell, who was then President of the Zambia Ladies' Golf Union with the reasoning that "none of the African countries were realistically able to compete in the World Championships, the Espirito Santo – their golfing standards simply needed a home grown training ground, rotating within the geographical area".

The inaugural edition was held in 1992 in Zimbabwe.

Format and timeline 
Initially it was proposed as a biennial event.

Each participating country is represented by three players and a non-playing captain. Using Eisenhower scoring, the best two scores per round count towards the daily team score in the 54-hole stroke play format.

Hosts and national team winners 

Source:

Individual winners

1 Defeated Norah Mbabazi in a playoff

Source:

References 

Golf tournaments in Africa
Women's golf tournaments
Recurring sporting events established in 1992
1992 establishments in Africa